Robert Smith, 1st Baron Carrington  (22 January 1752 – 18 September 1838), was a British banker and politician who sat in the House of Commons from 1779 to 1797 when he was raised to the peerage.

Early life
Smith was the third son of Abel Smith (1717–1788) and his wife Mary (née Bird, 1724–1780). His grandfather, also named Abel Smith (c. 1690 – 1756), was the founder of Smith's Bank of Nottingham. He married, as his first wife, Anne Boldero-Barnard (1756–1827), daughter of Lewyns and Anne (Popplewell) Boldero-Barnard, at Tottenham on 6 July 1780.

Politics
Smith succeeded his elder brother Abel, who died on 22 January 1779, three months after having been returned as MP for Nottingham. Smith was returned unopposed to replace him as MP for Nottingham in a by-election on 9 February 1779. He was reelected for Nottingham in 1780, 1784, 1790 and 1796.

In 1796, he was raised to the Peerage of Ireland as Baron Carrington, of Bulcote Lodge. His elevation to the Peerage was largely due to his involvement in 'sorting out' the parlous personal financial circumstances of the Prime Minister William Pitt the Younger.

The following year he was made Baron Carrington, of Upton in the County of Nottingham, in the Peerage of Great Britain, and had to vacate his seat in the House of Commons. He was replaced as one of the two members of parliament for Nottingham by Sir John Borlase Warren.

Later life
Smith was elected a Fellow of the Royal Society in 1800 and of the Society of Antiquaries in 1812. In 1819, he was admitted as Nobleman to Magdalene College, Cambridge. He was the Captain of Deal Castle from 1802 until his death.

According to the Legacies of British Slave-ownership at the University College London, Carrington was awarded a payment as a slave trader in the aftermath of the Slavery Abolition Act 1833 with the Slave Compensation Act 1837. The British Government took out a £15 million loan (worth £ in ) with interest from Nathan Mayer Rothschild and Moses Montefiore which was subsequently paid off by the British taxpayers (ending in 2015). Carrington was associated with three different claims, two of which were successful; he owned 268 slaves in Jamaica and received a £4,908 payment at the time (worth £ in ).

Family
Carrington's first wife, Anne, died in 1827. He  married, secondly, Charlotte Hudson (1770–1849), daughter of John Hudson and Susanna Trevelyan, in 1836. He was 83, she was 65. He died in September 1838, aged 86. By his first wife he had one son and five daughters. He was succeeded in his titles by his son Robert, who changed his last name to Carrington the next year.

Issue

References

Kidd, Charles, Williamson, David (editors). Debrett's Peerage and Baronetage (1990 edition). New York: St Martin's Press, 1990.

1752 births
1838 deaths
Alumni of Magdalene College, Cambridge
British bankers
Peers of Great Britain created by George III
Peers of Ireland created by George III
Smith, Robert
British MPs 1774–1780
British MPs 1780–1784
British MPs 1784–1790
British MPs 1790–1796
British MPs 1796–1800
Captains of Deal Castle
Robert
Fellows of the Society of Antiquaries of London
Fellows of the Royal Society
People from Upton, Newark and Sherwood
Robert 1
Recipients of payments from the Slavery Abolition Act 1833
British slave owners